The 2022–23 Nicholls Colonels men's basketball team represented Nicholls State University in the 2022–23 NCAA Division I men's basketball season. The Colonels, led by fifth-year head coach Austin Claunch, played their home games at Stopher Gymnasium in Thibodaux, Louisiana as members of the Southland Conference.

Previous season 
The Colonels finished the 2021–22 season 21–12, 11–3 in Southland Play to finish as regular season champions. They lost in the semifinals of the Southland tournament to Texas A&M Corpus-Christi. As a No. 1 seed who failed to win their conference tournament, they received an automatic bid to the National Invitation Tournament where they lost in the first round to SMU.

Preseason

Southland Conference poll
The Southland Conference released its preseason poll on October 25, 2022. The Colonels were picked to finish second in the conference.

Preseason All-Conference
Guard Latrell Jones was named to the conference's preseason first team. Forward Manny Littles and guard Pierce Spencer were named to the conference's second team.

Roster

Schedule and results

|-
!colspan=12 style=|Non-conference regular season

|-
!colspan=12 style=|Southland regular season

|-
!colspan=9 style=| Southland Tournament

Source:

See also
2022–23 Nicholls Colonels women's basketball team

References

Nicholls Colonels men's basketball seasons
Nicholls Colonels
Nicholls Colonels men's basketball
Nicholls Colonels men's basketball